"Cool About It" is a song co-written and recorded by Canadian-American country artist Meghan Patrick. She wrote the track with Corey Crowder and Cary Barlowe. It was the third single off Patrick's third studio album Heart on My Glass.

Background
"Cool About It" was one of the first songs Patrick wrote over Zoom during the COVID-19 pandemic. She stated the song was inspired by the idea that "when someone dumps you it doesn’t just break your heart, it kind of breaks your ego and your confidence".

Accolades

Music video
The official music video for "Cool About It" premiered on October 27, 2021. The video was directed by Sean Hagwell, and was inspired by the James Bond film series and Ocean's 11. Patrick said she wanted to "add more storyline to my songs and make it more of a mini movie than a music video". Hagwell stated he was inspired by the line, "Don’t blow my cover / We ain’t here together". Patrick believed it to be her best music video to date, adding "we may even have to do a sequel or prequel of this storyline for any subsequent singles off this record".

Chart performance
"Cool About It" reached a peak of number ten on the Billboard Canada Country chart dated March 19, 2022, marking Patrick's fifth career top ten hit.

References

2021 songs
2021 singles
Meghan Patrick songs
Warner Music Group singles
Songs written by Meghan Patrick
Songs written by Cary Barlowe
Songs written by Corey Crowder (songwriter)